The City of Vaughan 2003 Municipal Election took place on 10 November 2003. One mayor, three regional councillors and five local councillors have been elected for the city of Vaughan, Ontario, Canada. In addition, local school trustees have been elected to the York Region District School Board, York Catholic District School Board, Conseil scolaire de district du Centre-Sud-Ouest and Conseil scolaire de district catholique Centre-Sud. These elections were held in conjunction with all other municipalities across Ontario. (see 2003 Ontario municipal elections).

Following the resignation of Ward 5 local councillor, Susan Kadis on July 9, 2004, a by-election was held on November 25, 2004.

Candidates

Mayor

Regional Council

Because Mario Ferri received the highest vote count among the candidates for Regional Councillor, he was styled as the acting Mayor in cases where the Mayor is unavailable. However commonly confused, this is a different role than being the Deputy Mayor

Local Council

Ward 1

Ward 2

Ward 3

Ward 4

Ward 5

Ward 5 By-election 
Held on November 25, 2004

External links
 Vaughan Votes 2003

2003 Ontario municipal elections